Artur Terras (18 February 1901 – 23 November 1963) was an Estonian lawyer and politician who was the mayor of Tallinn from 24 August 1941 to September 1944. His older brother was former Estonian State Secretary Karl Terras.

After being deported in 1941, he was a Forest Brothers guerrilla fighter in Vihasoo, eventually becoming the commander of the North Estonian Omakaitse. He was the mayor of Tallinn during the majority of World War II, being mayor while Estonia was occupied by Nazi German forces. He assumed numerous titles, including mayor, lord mayor and first mayor (Erster Bürgermeister). He resigned in September 1944 after the Soviet Union reconquered Estonia. He was succeeded by Aleksander Kiidelmaa as chairman of the Executive Committee of Tallinn.

He eventually fled to Sweden and became a minister without portfolio of prime minister Otto Tief from 20 April 1952. He died on 23 November 1963 in Stockholm.

See also
List of mayors of Tallinn

References

1901 births
1963 deaths
People from Narva-Jõesuu
People from the Governorate of Estonia
20th-century Estonian politicians
Mayors of Tallinn
Estonian anti-communists
Estonian independence activists
Soviet dissidents
Estonian World War II refugees